Lock and Dam No. 22 is a lock and dam located near Saverton, Missouri, on the Upper Mississippi River around river mile 301.2. In 2004, the facility was listed in the National Register of Historic Places as Lock and Dam No. 22 Historic District, #04000182 covering , 1 building, 5 structures, 4 objects.

When the northern part of Mississippi freezes, near the first week of February, upwards of 20 bald eagles fly down to fish in the churning waters below Lock and Dam No. 22.

See also
 Public Works Administration dams list

References

External links

Lock and Dam No. 22 - U.S. Army Corps of Engineers

Dams completed in 1938
Mississippi River locks
Dams in Illinois
Dams in Missouri
National Register of Historic Places in Ralls County, Missouri
21
United States Army Corps of Engineers dams
Transport infrastructure completed in 1938
Roller dams
Gravity dams
Dams on the Mississippi River
Mississippi Valley Division
Historic American Engineering Record in Illinois
Historic American Engineering Record in Missouri
Historic districts on the National Register of Historic Places in Missouri
National Register of Historic Places in Pike County, Missouri
21
21
21
1938 establishments in Missouri
1938 establishments in Illinois
Transportation buildings and structures in Pike County, Illinois